The 1963 French Grand Prix was a Formula One motor race held at Reims on 30 June 1963. It was race 4 of 10 in both the 1963 World Championship of Drivers and the 1963 International Cup for Formula One Manufacturers. The race was won by Jim Clark driving a Lotus 25-Climax 1.5 litre V8.

Race report 
Jim Clark took the lead at the start from Richie Ginther in the BRM. All Graham Hill's hard work in qualifying second despite mechanical problems in practice came to nothing when his engine died on the grid and his car had to be push started. The subsequent one-minute penalty dropped him well back. Clark led dominantly, his lead being extended when a stone pierced Ginther's radiator, forcing him into the pits. Jack Brabham took second place after a strong fight with Trevor Taylor, who also suffered mechanical problems.

Brabham then began to gain significantly on Clark as the Scot's Climax engine started to splutter, however this proved to be a sporadic fault and he had enough of a lead to maintain the position. Brabham himself was delayed when an ignition lead came loose, handing second and third to Tony Maggs and a delighted Hill. Clark was over a minute ahead of them after yet another start-to-finish victory. Graham Hill was push started, incurring a one-minute penalty from the organisers, and was awarded no championship points for his third place. By finishing 7th, at 19 years and 345 days old, Chris Amon became the youngest driver to finish a world championship race. This record would hold for another 38 years, until it was broken by Fernando Alonso at the 2001 Australian Grand Prix.

Classification

Qualifying

Race

 Phil Hill was originally entered as car #24, to drive the ATS. When the ATS team withdrew, he switched to drive the Scuderia Filipinetti Lotus-BRM.

Championship standings after the race

Drivers' Championship standings

Constructors' Championship standings

 Notes: Only the top five positions are included for both sets of standings.

References

French Grand Prix
French Grand Prix
1963 in French motorsport